Alejandro Fabio Lanari (born 2 May 1960 in Buenos Aires, Argentina) is a retired Argentine football goalkeeper. He played for several clubs in Argentina and UANL Tigres in Mexico.

Lanari started his career in 1980 with 2nd division outfit Sportivo Italiano, where he stayed until 1986, making over 200 appearances for the club. Subsequently, he joined Rosario Central. Lanari helped Central win the Primera Division in the 1986–87 season.

In 1991. he moved to Mexico to play for Tigres, but returned in 1995 for a brief spell with Racing Club before moving to Argentinos Juniors. Argentinos were relegated in 1996 and Lanari played for them in the 2nd division for a season before he was signed as a reserve goalkeeper for Boca Juniors, where he retired in 1998 at the age of 38.

Lanari was part of the Argentina squad that won the 1991 Copa América.

Honours

Club
 Rosario Central
Primera Division Argentina: 1986–87

International
 Argentina
Copa América: 1991

References

External links
 Argentine Primera statistics at Fútbol XXI 

1960 births
Living people
Footballers from Buenos Aires
Argentine footballers
Argentina international footballers
1991 Copa América players
Association football goalkeepers
Sportivo Italiano footballers
Rosario Central footballers
Tigres UANL footballers
Racing Club de Avellaneda footballers
Argentinos Juniors footballers
Boca Juniors footballers
Argentine Primera División players
Liga MX players
Argentine expatriate footballers
Expatriate footballers in Mexico
Copa América-winning players